Marco Höger (born 16 September 1989) is a German professional footballer who plays as a midfielder or right back for Waldhof Mannheim.

Career

Alemannia Aachen
Born in Cologne, Höger began his career in 2005 in Alemannia Aachen's youth academy. In summer 2008, he was promoted to the reserve team where he earned his first senior cap on 17 August 2008 against TSV Germania Windeck in the NRW-Liga. He made his professional debut for Alemannia Aachen in the 2. Bundesliga on 6 March 2010 against FC Energie Cottbus and signed his first professional contract with Alemannia on 26 May 2010.

Schalke 04
On 9 June 2011, FC Schalke 04 confirmed that Höger signed a three-year professional contract with them until 30 June 2014. The transfer fee is reported as undisclosed by Schalke's sport and communications manager Horst Heldt. Marco Höger was assigned a number 12 shirt, previously worn by Peer Kluge.

On 8 January 2013, Schalke announced that Höger signed a two-year professional contract extension to 30 June 2016.

Following Schalke 04's 2–0 defeat to rivals 1. FC Köln, on 10 May 2015, Höger was suspended from training and first team action until 16 May 2015.

1. FC Köln
On 22 February 2016, Höger signed a five-year contract with 1. FC Köln starting in the 2016/17 season.

On 28 April 2018, he played as Köln lost 3–2 to SC Freiburg which confirmed Köln’s relegation from the Bundesliga.

Career statistics

Honours
Schalke 04
 DFL-Supercup: 2011

References

External links
 

1989 births
Living people
Footballers from Cologne
German footballers
Association football midfielders
Association football fullbacks
Alemannia Aachen players
FC Schalke 04 players
1. FC Köln players
SV Waldhof Mannheim players
Bundesliga players
2. Bundesliga players
3. Liga players